The 2012 PartyPoker.com World Grand Prix was the fifteenth staging of the World Grand Prix. It was played from 8–14 October 2012 at the Citywest Hotel in Dublin, Ireland.

Phil Taylor was the defending champion, but he lost 2–3 to Robert Thornton in the second round.

The final was won by Michael van Gerwen, who won his first major title by defeating Mervyn King 6–4.

Prize money
The total prize fund is £350,000. The following is the breakdown of the fund:

Qualification
The field of 32 players were made up from the top 16 in the PDC Order of Merit on September 16. The remaining 16 places went to the top 14 non-qualified players from the ProTour Order of Merit and then to the top 2 non-qualified residents of the Republic of Ireland and Northern Ireland from the 2012 ProTour Order of Merit.

Draw
The draw was made on 23 September 2012. The distance in the quarter-finals were reduced from best of 7 sets to best of 5 sets to end the night earlier.

Television coverage and sponsorship
The tournament was screened by Sky Sports in high definition.

PartyPoker.com sponsored the event for the second time.

References

External links
Official website
PDC Netzone; results, fixtures, reports

World Grand Prix (darts)
World Grand Prix
World Grand Prix (darts)